Bert Breen's Barn is a children's historical novel set in the early 1900s, written by Walter D. Edmonds and first published by Little Brown in 1975. The main character is Tom Dolan, an impoverished young man who lives in the north Adirondack country. The plot concerns Tom's fascination with Bert Breen's Barn, as well as the fortune that he believes to be buried beneath it.

The book won the 1976 National Book Award in category Children's Books.

References

Children's historical novels
National Book Award for Young People's Literature winning works
American children's novels
Novels set in New York (state)
1975 American novels
Novels set in the 1900s
1975 children's books
Little, Brown and Company books